Abbasabad-e Eskandari (also Romanized as ‘Abbāsābād-e Eskandarī; also known as ‘Abbāsābād) is a village in Sheshdeh Rural District, Sheshdeh and Qarah Bulaq District, Fasa County, Fars Province, Iran. At the 2006 census, its population was 336, in 75 families.

References 

Populated places in Fasa County